The Battle of Guanghua was fought between the National Revolutionary Army of Chiang Kai-shek and the Guominjun of Feng Yuxiang. Both sides were part of the Kuomintang.

Bibliography
中華民國國防大學編，《中國現代軍事史主要戰役表》

Conflicts in 1930